Clastoptera xanthocephala, the sunflower spittlebug, is a species of spittlebug in the family Clastopteridae. It is found in North America and Oceania.

References

External links

 

Articles created by Qbugbot
Insects described in 1839
Clastopteridae